Biddulph is a surname. Notable people with the surname include:

Cyril Biddulph (1887–1918), actor
Lady Elizabeth Philippa Biddulph (1834-1916), humanitarian, temperance leader; Woman of the Bedchamber to Queen Victoria
Howard Biddulph, political scientist
John Biddulph (1840–1921), soldier, author and naturalist
John Biddulph (civil servant)
Ken Biddulph (1932–2003), cricketer
Michael Biddulph, 1st Baron Biddulph
Lieutenant-General Sir Michael Biddulph (1823-1904)
Sir Michael Biddulph, 2nd Baronet (1652–1718)
Robert Biddulph (British Army officer) (1835–1918)
Robert Biddulph (MP) (1801–1864), politician
Sally Biddulph (born 1975), television journalist
Steve Biddulph (born 1953), author
Sir Theophilus Biddulph, 1st Baronet (1612–1683)